The 2016 FC Astana season is the eighth successive season that the club will play in the Kazakhstan Premier League, the highest tier of association football in Kazakhstan. Astana are defending Kazakhstan Premier League Champions, having been crowned Champions for the second time the previous season. They will also participate in the Kazakhstan Cup and the Champions League, entering at the Second Qualifying Stage.

Squad

Transfers

Winter

In:

Out:

Summer

In:

Out:

Friendlies

Competitions

Kazakhstan Super Cup

Premier League

Regular season

Results summary

Results by round

Results

League table

Championship round

Results summary

Results by round

Results

League table

Kazakhstan Cup

Final

UEFA Champions League

Qualifying rounds

UEFA Europa League

Qualifying rounds

Group stage

Squad statistics

Appearances and goals

|-
|colspan="14"|Players away from Astana on loan:

|-
|colspan="14"|Players who appeared for Astana that left during the season:

|}

Goal scorers

Clean sheets

Disciplinary record

References

External links
Official Website 
Official VK

FC Astana seasons
Astana
Astana